Multitrack recording (MTR), also known as multitracking, is a method of sound recording developed in 1955 that allows for the separate recording of multiple sound sources or of sound sources recorded at different times to create a cohesive whole. Multitracking became possible in the mid-1950s when the idea of simultaneously recording different audio channels to separate discrete "tracks" on the same reel-to-reel tape was developed. A "track" was simply a different channel recorded to its own discrete area on the tape whereby their relative sequence of recorded events would be preserved, and playback would be simultaneous or synchronized.

A multitrack recorder allows one or more sound sources to different tracks to be simultaneously recorded, which may subsequently be processed and mixed separately. Take, for example, a band with vocals, guitars, a keyboard, bass, and drums that are to be recorded. The singer's microphone, the output of the guitars and keys, and each individual drum in the kit can all be recorded separately using a multitrack recorder. This allows each track to be fine-tuned individually, such as increasing the voice or lowering the chimes, before combining them into the final product.

Prior to the development of multitracking, the sound recording process required all of the singers, band instrumentalists, and/or orchestra accompanists to perform at the same time in the same space. Multitrack recording was a significant technical improvement as it allowed studio engineers to record all of the instruments and vocals for a piece of music separately. Multitracking allowed the engineer to adjust the levels and tone of each individual track, and if necessary, redo certain tracks or overdub parts of the track to correct errors or get a better "take". As well, different electronic effects such as reverb could be applied to specific tracks, such as the lead vocals, while not being applied to other tracks where this effect would not be desirable (e.g., on the electric bass). Multitrack recording was much more than a technical innovation; it also enabled record producers and artists to create new sounds that would be impossible to create outside of the studio, such as a lead singer adding many harmony vocals with their own voice to their own lead vocal part, an electric guitar player playing many harmony parts along with their own guitar solo, or even recording the drums and replaying the track backwards for an unusual effect.

In the 1980s and 1990s, computers provided means by which both sound recording and reproduction could be digitized, revolutionizing audio recording and distribution. In the 2000s, multitracking hardware and software for computers was of sufficient quality to be widely used for high-end audio recordings by both professional sound engineers and by bands recording without studios using widely available programs, which can be used on a high-end laptop computer. Though magnetic tape has not been replaced as a recording medium, the advantages of non-linear editing (NLE) and recording have resulted in digital systems largely superseding tape. Even in the 2010s, with digital multitracking being the dominant technology, the original word "track" is still used by audio engineers.

Process

Multitracking can be achieved with analogue recording, tape-based equipment (from simple, late-1970s cassette-based four-track Portastudios, to eight-track cassette machines, to 2" reel-to-reel 24-track machines), digital equipment that relies on tape storage of recorded digital data (such as ADAT eight-track machines) and hard disk-based systems often employing a computer and audio recording software. Multi-track recording devices vary in their specifications, such as the number of simultaneous tracks available for recording at any one time; in the case of tape-based systems this is limited by, among other factors, the physical size of the tape employed.

With the introduction of SMPTE timecode in the early 1970s, engineers began to use computers to perfectly synchronize separate audio and video playback, or multiple audio tape machines. In this system, one track of each machine carried the timecode signal, while the remaining tracks were available for sound recording. Some large studios were able to link multiple 24-track machines together. An extreme example of this occurred in 1982, when the rock group Toto recorded parts of Toto IV on three synchronized 24-track machines. This setup theoretically provided for up to 69 audio tracks.

For computer-based systems, the trend in the 2000s is towards unlimited numbers of record/playback tracks, although issues such as RAM memory and CPU available do limit this from machine to machine. Moreover, on computer-based systems, the number of simultaneously available recording tracks is limited by the number of sound card discrete analog or digital inputs.

When recording, audio engineers can select which track (or tracks) on the device will be used for each instrument, voice, or other input and can even blend one track with two instruments to vary the music and sound options available. At any given point on the tape, any of the tracks on the recording device can be recording or playing back using sel-sync or Selective Synchronous recording. This allows an artist to be able to record onto track 2 and, simultaneously, listen to track 1, 3 and 7, allowing them to sing or to play an accompaniment to the performance already recorded on these tracks. They might then record an alternate version on track 4 while listening to the other tracks. All the tracks can then be played back in perfect synchrony, as if they had originally been played and recorded together. This can be repeated until all of the available tracks have been used, or in some cases, reused. During mixdown, a separate set of playback heads with higher fidelity are used.

Before all tracks are filled, any number of existing tracks can be "bounced" into one or two tracks, and the original tracks erased, making more room for more tracks to be reused for fresh recording. In 1963, the Beatles were using twin track for Please Please Me. The Beatles' producer George Martin used this technique extensively to achieve multiple-track results, while still being limited to using only multiple four-track machines, until an eight-track machine became available during the recording of the Beatles' self-titled ninth album. The Beach Boys' Pet Sounds also made innovative use of multitracking with eight-track machines of the day (circa 1965). Motown also began recording with eight-track machines in 1965, before moving to 16-track machines in mid-1969.

Multitrack recording also allows any recording artist to record multiple "takes" of any given section of their performance, allowing them to refine their performance to virtual perfection by making additional "takes" of songs or instrumental tracks. A recording engineer can record only the section being worked on, without erasing any other section of that track. This process of turning the recording mechanism on and off is called "punching in" and "punching out". (See "Punch in / out".)

When recording is completed, the many tracks are "mixed down" through a mixing console to a two-track stereo recorder in a format which can then be duplicated and distributed. (Movie and DVD soundtracks can be mixed down to four or more tracks, as needed, the most common being five tracks, with an additional Low Frequency Effects track, hence the "5.1" surround sound most commonly available on DVDs.)

Most of the records, CDs and cassettes commercially available in a music store are recordings that were originally recorded on multiple tracks, and then mixed down to stereo. In some rare cases, as when an older song is technically "updated", these stereo (or mono) mixes can in turn be recorded (as if it were a "submix") onto two (or one) tracks of a multitrack recorder, allowing additional sound (tracks) to be layered on the remaining tracks.

Flexibility
During multitracking, multiple musical instruments (and vocals) can be recorded, either one at a time or simultaneously, onto individual tracks, so that the sounds thus recorded can be accessed, processed and manipulated individually to produce the desired results. In the 2010s, many rock and pop bands record each part of the song one after the other. First, the bass and drums are often recorded, followed by the chordal rhythm section instruments. Then the lead vocals and guitar solos are added. As a last step, the harmony vocals are added. On the other hand, orchestras are always recorded with all 70 to 100 instrumentalists playing their parts simultaneously. If each group of instrument has its own microphone, and each instrument with a solo melody has its own microphone, the different microphones can record on multiple tracks simultaneously. After recording the orchestra, the record producer and conductor can adjust the balance and tone of the different instrument sections and solo instruments, because each section and solo instrument was recorded to its own track.

With the rock or pop band example, after recording some parts of a song, an artist might listen to only the guitar part, by 'muting' all the tracks except the one on which the guitar was recorded. If one then wanted to listen to the lead vocals in isolation, one would do so by muting all the tracks apart from the lead vocals track. If one wanted to listen to the entire song, one could do so by un-muting all the tracks. If one did not like the guitar part, or found a mistake in it, and wanted to replace it, one could do so by re-recording only the guitar part (i.e., re-recording only the track on which the guitar was recorded), rather than re-recording the entire song.

If all the voices and instruments in a recording are individually recorded on distinct tracks, then the artist is able to retain complete control over the final sculpting of the song, during the mix-down (re-recording to two stereo tracks for mass distribution) phase. For example, if an artist wanted to apply one effects unit to a synthesizer part, a different effect to a guitar part, a 'chorused reverb' effect to the lead vocals, and different effects to all the drums and percussion instruments, they could not do so if they had all been originally recorded together onto the same track. However, if they had been recorded onto separate tracks, then the artist could blend and alter all of the instrument and vocal sounds with complete freedom.

Multitracking a song also leaves open the possibilities of remixes by the same or future artists, such as DJs. If the song was not available in a multitrack format recording, the job of the remixing artist was very difficult, or impossible, because, once the tracks had been re-recorded together onto a single track ('mixed down'), they were previously considered inseparable. More recent software allows sound source separation, whereby individual instruments, voices and effects can be 'upmixed' — isolated from a single-track source — in high quality. This has permitted the production of stereophonic or surround sound mixes of recordings that were originally mastered and released in mono.

History

The process was conceived and developed by Ross Snyder at Ampex in 1955 resulting in the first Sel-Sync machine, an 8-track machine which used one-inch tape. This 8-track recorder was sold to the American guitarist, songwriter, luthier, and inventor Les Paul for $10,000.  It became known as the "Octopus". Les Paul, Mary Ford and Patti Page used the technology in the late 1950s to enhance vocals and instruments. From these beginnings, it evolved in subsequent decades into a mainstream recording technique.

With computers
Since the early 1990s, many performers have recorded music using only a Mac or PC equipped with multitrack recording software as a tracking machine. The computer must have a sound card or other type of audio interface with one or more Analog-to-digital converters. Microphones are needed to record the sounds of vocalists or acoustic instruments.  Depending on the capabilities of the system, some instruments, such as a synthesizer or electric guitar, can also be sent to an interface directly using Line level or MIDI inputs. Direct inputs eliminate the need for microphones and can provide another range of sound control options.

There are tremendous differences in computer audio interfaces. Such units vary widely in price, sound quality, and flexibility. The most basic interfaces use audio circuitry that is built into the computer motherboard. The most sophisticated audio interfaces are external units of professional studio quality which can cost thousands of dollars. Professional interfaces usually use one or more IEEE 1394 (commonly known as FireWire) connections. Other types of interfaces may use internal PCI cards, or external USB connections. Popular manufacturers of high-quality interfaces include Apogee Electronics, Avid Audio (formerly Digidesign), Echo Digital Audio, Focusrite, MOTU, RME Audio, M-Audio and PreSonus.

Microphones are often designed for highly specific applications and have a major effect on recording quality.  A single studio-quality microphone can cost $5,000 or more, while consumer-quality recording microphones can be bought for less than $50 each. Microphones also need some type of microphone preamplifier to prepare the signal for use by other equipment. These preamplifiers can also have a major effect on the sound and come in different price ranges, physical configurations, and capability levels. Microphone preamplifiers may be external units or a built in feature of other audio equipment.

Software
Software for multitrack recording can record multiple tracks at once. It generally uses graphic notation for an interface and offers a number of views of the music. Most multitrackers also provide audio playback capability.  Some multitrack software also provides MIDI playback functions not just for audio; during playback the MIDI data is sent to a softsynth or virtual instrument (e.g., VSTi) which converts the data to audio sound. Multitrack software may also provide other features that qualify it being called a digital audio workstation (DAW). These features may include various displays including showing the score of the music, as well as editing capability.  There is often overlap between many of the categories of musical software. In this case scorewriters and full featured multitrackers such as DAWs have similar features for playback, but may have less similarity for editing and recording.

Multitrack recording software varies widely in price and capability.  Popular multitrack recording software programs include: Reason, Ableton Live, FL Studio, Adobe Audition, Pro Tools, Digital Performer, Cakewalk Sonar, Samplitude, Nuendo, Cubase and Logic. Lower-cost alternatives include Mixcraft, REAPER and n-Track Studio. Open-source and free software programs are also available for multitrack recording. These range from very basic programs such as Jokosher to Ardour and Audacity, which are capable of performing many functions of the most sophisticated programs.

Instruments and voices are usually recorded as individual files on a computer hard drive. These function as tracks which can be added, removed or processed in many ways. Effects such as reverb, chorus, and delays can be applied by electronic devices or by computer software. Such effects are used to shape the sound as desired by the producer.  When the producer is satisfied with the recorded sound finished tracks can be mixed into a new stereo pair of tracks within the multitrack recording software. Finally, the final stereo recording can be written to a CD, which can be copied and distributed.

Order of recording
In modern popular songs, drums, percussion instruments and electric bass are often among the first instruments to be recorded.
These are the core instruments of the rhythm section. Musicians recording later tracks use the precise attack of the drum sounds as a rhythmic guide. In some styles, the drums may be recorded for a few bars and then looped. Click (metronome) tracks are also often used as the first sound to be recorded, especially when the drummer is not available for the initial recording, and/or the final mix will be synchronized with motion picture and/or video images. One reason that a band may start with just the drums is because this allows the band to pick the song's key later on. The producer and the musicians can experiment with the song's key and arrangement against the basic rhythm track. Also, though the drums might eventually be mixed down to a couple of tracks, each individual drum and percussion instrument might be initially recorded to its own individual track. The drums and percussion combined can occupy a large number of tracks utilized in a recording. This is done so that each percussion instrument can be processed individually for maximum effect. Equalization (or EQ) is often used on individual drums, to bring out each one's characteristic sound. The last tracks recorded are often the vocals (though a temporary vocal track may be recorded early on either as a reference or to guide subsequent musicians; this is sometimes called a "guide vocal", "ghost vocal" or "scratch vocal"). One reason for this is that singers will often temper their vocal expression in accordance with the accompaniment. Producers and songwriters can also use the guide/scratch vocal when they have not quite ironed out all the lyrics or for flexibility based on who sings the lead vocal (as The Alan Parsons Project's Eric Woolfson often did).

Concert music
For classical and jazz recordings, particularly instrumentals where multitracking is chosen as the recording method (as opposed to direct to stereo, for example), a different arrangement is used; all tracks are recorded simultaneously. Sound barriers are often placed between different groups within the orchestra, e.g. pianists, violinists, percussionists, etc. When barriers are used, these groups listen to each other via headphones.

Multitrack live recording is a lot like gigging – a lot of planning ahead of time, a lot of gear to carry and set up, a lot of waiting, and then a lot of hectic activity over the next 40 minutes or so! There's little doubt that a pseudolive studio performance can enhance certain forms of music, particularly those with a lot of intensity in the live performance, but it still lacks the atmosphere of a real gig. You may record the moment with a portable setup during the performance. You can produce wonderful live recordings with just two microphones and a building's inherent acoustics, but that will have to wait for another day. Taking a feed from the front of house (or FOH) desk directly to tape or DAT is another technique of live recording, although this will only work in large venues where everything is run through the PA system. Even so, a loud backline will result in less guitar and bass being routed via the main PA system, resulting in an unbalanced mix. A multitrack recording has distinct advantages: it allows you more control after the event because you may fine-tune the mix and correct any obvious mistakes without sacrificing the thrill of the live performance. It does, however, necessitate a lot more pre-gig planning as well as a lot more equipment.

See also

 Click track
 Comparison of digital audio editors
 Digital audio workstation
 Dynamic range compression
 Fostex
 List of musical works released in a stem format
 MIDI mockup
 Module file
 Overdubbing
 Portastudio
 Surround sound
 Quadraphonic sound
 Remix
 Reverb
 Sound effects#Techniques
 TASCAM
 Revox

References

External links
 n-Track Studio - Multitrack recording software
 "All You Need is Ears" by George Martin, p. 148-157
 The History of Magnetic Recording
 Recording Technology History
 Der Bingle Technology
 "Both Sides Now" webpage on Ampex Records
 AES Historical Committee: Ampex History Project

 
Sound recording
Tape recording

ja:マルチトラック・レコーダー